John William Shore  (c. 1924 – March 21, 1973), better known as Johnny Shore, was a Canadian football player who played for the Toronto Argonauts. He won the Grey Cup with them in 1950. He had previously played football for the Toronto Varsity Blues at the University of Toronto.

Prior to university, Shore attended the Glebe Collegiate Institute in Ottawa before enrolling in the Royal Canadian Air Force during World War II. He withdrew from active service aged 21 in order to play for the Carleton Ravens, before transferring to the University of Toronto. He later moved to London, Ontario and died in March 1973.

References

External links
Pro Football Archives: Johnny Shore

1920s births
1973 deaths
Toronto Argonauts players
Toronto Varsity Blues football players